Grosse Pointe Park is a city in Wayne County in the U.S. state of Michigan. The population was 11,555 at the 2010 census. 

Bordering on Detroit with frontage on southern Lake St. Clair, it is the southernmost of the Grosse Pointe suburbs.  Grosse Pointe Park was incorporated as a village in 1907 and again as a city in 1950.

In November 2021, Grosse Pointe Park elected its first female mayor, Michele Hodges.

History 
Before incorporation as a city, the area that would become the city of Grosse Pointe Park was incorporated as the Village of Fairview, which spanned Bewick Street in the west to Cadieux Road in the east in Grosse Pointe Township.  The city of Detroit annexed part of the village in the township from Bewick Street to Alter Road in 1907.  Fearing further annexation, the part of the village east of Alter Road incorporated as the Village of Grosse Pointe Park later that year.  Seeking further annexation protection from Detroit and independence from its township, the village reincorporated as a city in 1950.

Geography 
The water is part of Lake St. Clair.

Description 

The west side of the city features mixed-use neighborhoods, where retail, schools, and churches are within close walking distance. The rest of the city is basically residential, but at the eastern edge residents are in close walking distance to "the Village" shopping district in Grosse Pointe. Many of the houses in the Park were built prior to World War II, and many of these were designed by noted architects using the finest materials. Windmill Pointe Drive, and streets such as Bishop, Kensington, Yorkshire, Edgemont Park, Three Mile Drive, Devonshire, Buckingham, Berkshire, Balfour, Middlesex, and Nottingham among others, each have dozens of large, architecturally significant homes. These mansions and mini-mansions were often placed on large lots which were often split up, the result being that some post-war ranch style homes are mixed in with homes of traditional design.

Grosse Pointe Park includes a large neighborhood located on Windmill Pointe, the edge of which marks the entrance to the Detroit River and the end of Lake St. Clair. A large lakefront park with a pool, gym, movie theaters, and gathering spaces for residents only is found at this spot. At the base of the point, at the foot of Three Mile Drive, is another large park, Patterson Park, which is known for its skating rink and walking trails. One way that people distinguish geography in Grosse Pointe Park is by location north or south of Jefferson Avenue, the south side being generalized as Windmill Pointe.

The Park also includes a section known as the "cabbage patch," an area of town with multi-family houses in contrast to the single-family homes with larger lots that populate the vast majority of the Grosse Pointes.  The cabbage patch is generally considered to be the northwest corner of the city, bounded by Mack, Wayburn, Jefferson, and Somerset, with a small extension south of Jefferson on Nottingham and Beaconsfield.  The region's name can be seen in various local establishments such as the Cabbage Patch Cafe and Cabbage Patch Saloon.

Grosse Pointe Park, along with Grosse Pointe and Grosse Pointe Farms, is in the Grosse Pointe South High School district. The elementary school in the Park: Defer, is in addition to one middle school: Pierce Middle School. The eastern Park is also served by Maire Elementary in Grosse Pointe in the Village district. Then serves the one high school, South High School off Fisher Road. There is one private school in the Park, the K-8 St. Clare of Montefalco Catholic School on Charlevoix and Audubon streets.

Demographics

2010 census
As of the census of 2010, there were 11,555 people, 4,516 households, and 3,182 families residing in the city. The racial makeup of the city was 85.0% White, 10.5% African American, 0.2% Native American, 1.8% Asian, 0.5% from other races, and 1.9% from two or more races. Hispanic or Latino of any race were 2.5% of the population.

There were 4,516 households, of which 35.8% had children under the age of 18 living with them, 55.6% were married couples living together, 11.8% had a female householder with no husband present, 3.1% had a male householder with no wife present, and 29.5% were non-families. 24.7% of all households were made up of individuals, and 8.8% had someone living alone who was 65 years of age or older. The average household size was 2.56 and the average family size was 3.10.

The median age in the city was 41.8 years. 26.5% of residents were under the age of 18; 6.6% were between the ages of 18 and 24; 22.1% were from 25 to 44; 32.1% were from 45 to 64; and 12.8% were 65 years of age or older. The gender makeup of the city was 48.4% male and 51.6% female.

2000 census
As of the census of 2000, there were 12,443 people, 4,816 households, and 3,303 families residing in the city. The racial makeup of the city was 92.48% White, 2.95% African American, 0.35% Native American, 1.82% Asian, 0.03% Pacific Islander, 0.39% from other races, and 1.98% from two or more races. Hispanic or Latino of any race were 1.74% of the population.

There were 4,816 households, out of which 35.6% had children under the age of 18 living with them, 57.3% were married couples living together, 8.5% had a female householder with no husband present, and 31.4% were non-families. 26.2% of all households were made up of individuals, and 7.6% had someone living alone who was 65 years of age or older. The average household size was 2.58 and the average family size was 3.18.

In the city, the population was spread out, with 27.5% under the age of 18, 6.1% from 18 to 24, 29.3% from 25 to 44, 26.3% from 45 to 64, and 10.8% who were 65 years of age or older. The median age was 38 years. For every 100 females, there were 94.1 males. For every 100 females age 18 and over, there were 91.2 males.

The median income for a household in the city was $105,161. Males had a median income of $92,611 versus $63,488 for females. The per capita income for the city was $58,223. About 1.8% of families and 4.0% of the population were below the poverty line, including 3.1% of those under age 18 and 1.9% of those age 65 or over.

Education

Primary and secondary schools

Grosse Pointe Public Schools serves Grosse Pointe Park.

Defer Elementary School, and Pierce Middle School are located in Grosse Pointe Park. All residents are zoned to Pierce Middle and Grosse Pointe South High School in Grosse Pointe Farms.

St. Clare of Montefalco School, a private Catholic K-8 school, is in Grosse Pointe Park.

Public libraries
The Grosse Pointe Public Library operates the Carolyn and Ted Ewald Memorial Branch Library in Grosse Pointe Park. The library was scheduled to open in 2004. The  branch was originally scheduled to open in October of that year, but delays moved the opening month to January 2005.

Notable people
Jane Bashara, marketing executive and murder victim
Dorothy Marie Donnelly, poet
Mariela Griffor, author, moved to Grosse Pointe from Chile
Mark Tremonti, musician
Anita Baker, singer

Images

References

Further reading
Detroit & Grosse Pointe Park to Open New Gateway Between Cities—DBusiness, August 18, 2014
Detroit & Grosse Pointe Park Kercheval Avenue Agreement.—August 18, 2014

External links

City of Grosse Pointe Park official website
Grosse Pointe Historical Society
Trombly Elementary School 
Pierce Middle School

Cities in Wayne County, Michigan
Michigan populated places on the Detroit River
Michigan populated places on Lake St. Clair
Metro Detroit
Populated places established in 1907
1907 establishments in Michigan